Enneapterygius howensis, the Lord Howe Island triplefin, is a species of threefin blenny in the genus Enneapterygius, described by German ichthyologist Ronald Fricke in 1997. It is endemic to Lord Howe Island.

References

howensis
Fish described in 1997